The Album is the upcoming sixth studio album by American pop rock band Jonas Brothers. It is set to be released on May 12, 2023, through Republic Records. The album will be supported by the song, "Wings", which was released as the lead single on February 24, 2023. It serves as the follow-up to their previous album, Happiness Begins (2019).

Background and recording
On February 25, 2020, during an interview on the The Today Show, Nick Jonas revealed that the group had been working on a new album with Ryan Tedder and that the details are "going to be announced in the next couple weeks", also hinting that "What a Man Gotta Do", a single that they had released the previous month, would serve as the potential lead single for it. On September 23, 2022, the group posted a picture of Nick, Joe, and Kevin Jonas in a recording studio with Jon Bellion, who was sitting at a piano, writing that they were in the process of creating the album, in which Joe also hinted at its completion. 

On January 13, 2023, Nick appeared on The Kelly Clarkson Show, in which he shared that the album had been completed and that the Jonas Brothers were currently "kind of in that planning moment with the campaign, the album, the single – all the things". Exactly two weeks later, Nick, Joe, and Kevin sat down for an interview with Variety, in which they revealed that the album includes of elements of 1970s pop and Americana and is partly influenced by the Bee Gees and the Doobie Brothers, while they also revealed the titles of a few songs from it: "Wings", "Montana Sky", "Vacation Eyes", "Little Bird", "Waffle House". On January 29, Joe teased a snippet of "Wings" through a video that showed him in a studio with both Nick and Kevin. The following day, all three brothers went on the Hollywood Walk of Fame, in which they announced that the album would be titled The Album and released on May 5. On February 22, the band announced the album had been delayed a week to May 12.

Promotion

Singles

The song "Wings" was released as the lead single on February 24, 2023.

Track listing

Release history

References

2023 albums
Jonas Brothers albums
Upcoming albums